Hiram Bingham III (November 19, 1875 – June 6, 1956) was an American academic, explorer and politician. He made public the existence of the Inca citadel of Machu Picchu in 1911 with the guidance of local indigenous farmers. Later, Bingham served as the 69th Governor of Connecticut for a single day in 1925—the shortest term in history—and then as a member of the United States Senate until 1933.

Early life and early academic career
Bingham was born in Honolulu, Hawaii, the son of Clara Brewster and Hiram Bingham II (1831–1908), an early Protestant missionary to the Kingdom of Hawai'i, the grandson of Hiram Bingham I (1789–1869) and Sybil Moseley Bingham (1792–1848), earlier missionaries. He attended O'ahu College, now known as Punahou School, from 1882 to 1892. He went to the United States in his teens in order to complete his education, entering Phillips Academy in Andover, Massachusetts, from which he graduated in 1894. He earned a B.A. degree from Yale College in 1898, a degree from the University of California, Berkeley in 1900, where he took one of the first courses on Latin American history offered in the United States, and Ph.D. from Harvard University in 1905. Since Harvard at the time did not have a specialist in Latin American history, Edward Gaylord Bourne of Yale served as the examiner for Bingham's qualifying exams.  While at Yale, Bingham was a member of Acacia fraternity. He taught history and politics at Harvard and then served as preceptor under Woodrow Wilson at Princeton University. Princeton "did not much favor Latin American history," so in 1907, when Yale sought a replacement for Bourne, who had died an early death, it appointed Bingham as a lecturer in South American history. Bingham was one of the pioneers of teaching and research on Latin American history in the U.S. In 1908, he published an assessment of the field's prospects, "The Possibilities of South American History and Politics as a Field for Research," in which he surveyed library and archival resources in the U.S. as well as in South America. From 1924, he was a member of the Acorn Club.

Explorer

Bingham was not a trained archaeologist. Yet it was during Bingham's time as a lecturer and professor in South American history at Yale that he rediscovered the largely forgotten Inca city of Machu Picchu. In 1908 he had served as a delegate to the First Pan American Scientific Congress at Santiago, Chile. On his way home via Peru, a local prefect convinced him to visit the pre-Columbian city of Choquequirao. Bingham published an account of this trip in Across South America; an account of a journey from Buenos Aires to Lima by way of Potosí, with notes on Brazil, Argentina, Bolivia, Chile, and Peru.

Bingham was thrilled by the prospect of unexplored Inca cities, and organized the 1911 Yale Peruvian Expedition, one of the objectives of which was to search for the last capital of the Incas. Guided by locals, he rediscovered and correctly identified both Vitcos (then called Rosaspata) and Vilcabamba (then called Espíritu Pampa), which he named "Eromboni Pampa", but did not correctly recognize Vilcabamba as the last capital, instead continuing onward and misidentifying Machu Picchu as the "Lost City of the Incas". Decades later, Bingham's oversight was rectified by the Andean explorer Vince Lee, whose detailed researches proved that Vilcabamba was indeed the Incas' last capital.

On July 24, 1911, Melchor Arteaga led Bingham to Machu Picchu, which had been largely forgotten by everybody except the small number of people living in the immediate valley (possibly including two local missionaries named Thomas Payne and Stuart McNairn whose descendants claim that they had already climbed to the ruins in 1906). Also, the Cusco explorers Enrique Palma, Gabino Sanchez, and Agustín Lizarraga are said to have arrived at the site in 1901.

Bingham returned to Peru in 1912, 1914, and 1915 with the support of Yale and the National Geographic Society. In The Lost City of the Incas (1948), Bingham related how he came to believe that Machu Picchu housed a major religious shrine and served as a training center for religious leaders. Modern archaeological research has since determined that the site was not a religious center but a royal estate to which Inca leaders and their entourage repaired during the Andean summer. A key element of the expeditions' legacy are the collections of exotic animals, antiquities, and human skeletal remains. These objects exposed the modern world to a new view of ancient Peru and allowed 20th-century interpreters to interpret Machu Picchu as a "lost city" that Bingham "scientifically discovered". Bingham merged his reliance on prospecting by local huaqueros with the notion that science had a sovereign claim on all artifacts that might contribute to the accumulation of knowledge. Yale University in 2012 began returning to Peru thousands of objects Bingham took to Yale from Macchu Picchu by permission of a decree by the Peruvian government. Peru argued that the objects were only loaned to Yale, not given.

Machu Picchu has become one of the major tourist attractions in South America, and Bingham is recognized as the man who brought the site to world attention, although many others helped. The switchback-filled road that carries tourist buses to the site from the Urubamba River is called Carretera Hiram Bingham (the Hiram Bingham Highway).

Bingham has been cited as one possible basis for the character Indiana Jones.<ref>[https://www.usatoday.com/travel/destinations/2005-09-22-peru_x.htm The trail less trampled on] in USA Today by Gene Sloan, September 23, 2005: "The iconic mountaintop citadel, discovered less than a century ago by American explorer Hiram Bingham, the inspiration for Indiana Jones, is a thrilling reward after days of exertion."</ref> His book Lost City of the Incas became a bestseller upon its publication in 1948.

Peru has long sought the return of the estimated 40,000 artifacts, including mummies, ceramics, and bones, that Bingham excavated and exported from Machu Picchu. On September 14, 2007, an agreement was made between Yale University and the Peruvian government for the objects' return. On April 12, 2008, the Peruvian government said it had revised previous estimates of 4,000 pieces up to 40,000.

Prior discoverers of Machu Picchu
An 1874 map shows the site of Machu Picchu.

Soon after Bingham announced the existence of Machu Picchu, others came forward claiming to have seen the city first, such as the British missionary Thomas Payne and a German engineer named J. M. von Hassel.  Recent discoveries have put forth a new claimant, a German named  who bought land opposite the Machu Picchu mountain in the 1860s and then tried to raise money from investors to plunder nearby Incan ruins.

Marriage and family

He married Alfreda Mitchell, granddaughter of Charles L. Tiffany, on November 20, 1900, and had seven sons: Woodbridge (1901–1986) (professor), Hiram Bingham IV (1903–1988) (diplomat and World War II hero), Alfred Mitchell Bingham (1905–1998) (lawyer and author), Charles Tiffany (1906–1993) (physician), Brewster (1908–1995) (minister), Mitchell (1910–1994) (artist), and Jonathan Brewster Bingham (1914–1986) (Democratic Congressman). After a divorce he married Suzanne Carroll Hill in June 1937, Alfreda Mitchell remarried pianist Henry Gregor in August 1937.

In 1982 Temple University Press published Char Miller's doctoral dissertation on the Bingham family titled "Fathers and sons: The Bingham family and the American mission."

Military
Bingham achieved the rank of captain of the Connecticut National Guard in 1916. In 1917, he became an aviator and organized the United States Schools of Military Aeronautics at eight universities to provide ground school training for aviation cadets. He served the Aviation Section, U.S. Signal Corps and the Air Service, attaining the rank of lieutenant colonel. In Issoudun, France, Bingham commanded the Third Aviation Instruction Center, the Air Service's largest primary instruction and pursuit training school.  He became a supporter of the Air Service in their post-war quest for independence from the Army and supported that effort, in part, with the publication of his wartime experiences titled, An Explorer in the Air Service published in 1920 by Yale University Press.

Politics

In 1922, Bingham was elected lieutenant governor of Connecticut, an office he held until 1924. In November 1924, he was elected governor. On December 16, 1924, Bingham was also elected as a Republican to serve in the United States Senate to fill a vacancy created by the suicide of Frank Bosworth Brandegee. Bingham defeated noted educator Hamilton Holt by a handy margin. Now both governor-elect and senator-elect, Bingham served as governor for one day, the shortest term of any Connecticut governor, before resigning to take up his Senate seat.

Bingham was reelected to a full six-year Senate term in 1926.

Bingham was Chairman of the Committee on Printing and then Chairman of the Committee on Territories and Insular Possessions. President Calvin Coolidge appointed Bingham to the President's Aircraft Board during his first term in the Senate; the press quickly dubbed the ex-explorer "The Flying Senator".

Bingham failed in his second reelection effort in the wake of the 1932 Democratic landslide following the Great Depression and left the Senate at the end of his second term in 1933.

During World War II, Bingham lectured at several United States Navy training schools. In 1951 he was appointed Chairman of the Civil Service Commission Loyalty Review Board, an assignment he kept through 1953.

Censure in the Senate

The Senate Judiciary Subcommittee investigated an arrangement between Bingham, his clerk, and a lobbyist who agreed to pass information on to Bingham's office after executing a plan that was irregular "even by the standards of his day." Bingham took his clerk off duty, and paid his salary to the lobbyist, thus allowing him to attend as a Senate staffer to closed meetings of the Finance Committee's deliberations on tariff legislation.

The Judiciary Subcommittee initially condemned Bingham's scheme but recommended no formal Senate action. Subsequently, Bingham decided to label the subcommittee's inquiry a partisan witch hunt, provoking further Senate interest, which eventually led to a resolution of censure that passed on November 4, 1929, by a vote of 54 to 22.

Death
On June 6, 1956, Bingham died at his Washington, D.C. home. He was interred at Arlington National Cemetery in Virginia.

See also
 Eternity in their Hearts by Don Richardson, Regal Books, Ventura, CA, 1981. , pp. 34–35
 List of federal political scandals in the United States
 List of United States senators expelled or censured

References

Further reading
 Balm, Roger. "Discovery as autobiography: the Machu Picchu case." Terrae Incognitae 40.1 (2008): 102-113.
 Bingham, Alfred M. "Raiders of the Lost City" American Heritage (1987) 38#5 pp 54–63.
 Bingham, Alfred Mitchell. Explorer of Machu Picchu: Portrait of Hiram Bingham (Triune Books, 1989).
 Gade, Daniel W. "Urubamba Ramble: Hiram Bingham (1875–1956) and His Artful Encounter with Machu Picchu." in Gade, "Spell of the Urubamba: Anthropogeographical Essays on an Andean Valley in Space and Time" (Springer, 2016) pp. 239–272.
 Hall, Amy Cox. "Collecting a “Lost City” for Science: Huaquero Vision and the Yale Peruvian Expeditions to Machu Picchu, 1911, 1912, and 1914–15." Ethnohistory 59.2 (2012): 293-321. online
  Rice, Mark.  Making Machu Picchu: The Politics of Tourism in Twentieth-Century Peru (U of North Carolina Press, 2018) online review
 Salvatore, Ricardo D. Disciplinary Conquest: US Scholars in South America, 1900–1945'' (Duke University Press, 2016),

External links

 
 
 
 Works by Hiram Bingham at Google Books
 Guide to the Records of the Yale Peruvian Expedition, including Bingham's diaries
 Selection from Bingham's The Lost City of the Incas
 Machu Picchu on the Web – The Discovery
 Inca Land, by Hiram Bingham
 The Explorer of Machi Picchu by Alfred M. Bingham web site

|-

|-

|-

|-

1875 births
1956 deaths
20th-century American historians
20th-century American male writers
American explorers
American male non-fiction writers
American Protestants
Aviators from Hawaii
Burials at Arlington National Cemetery
Censured or reprimanded United States senators
Explorers of South America
Republican Party governors of Connecticut
Harvard University alumni
Harvard University faculty
Historians of Latin America
Incan scholars
Latin Americanists
Military personnel from Connecticut
People from Honolulu
Princeton University faculty
Punahou School alumni
Republican Party United States senators from Connecticut
UC Berkeley College of Letters and Science alumni
United States Army officers
Yale College alumni
Yale University faculty